Fibigia is a genus of flowering plants in the family Brassicaceae.

Fibigia clypeata (L.) Medik.
Fibigia lunarioides (Willd.) Sibth. & Sm.
Fibigia macrocarpa (Boiss.) Boiss.
Fibigia suffruticosa (Vent.) Sweet

References

External links

Brassicaceae
Brassicaceae genera
Flora of Turkey